The Judo competition at the 1992 Summer Olympics was contested in fourteen weight classes, seven each for men and women. The seven men's weight classes continued to be those first used in 1980. This was the first Olympic competition to award medals to women judoka; women competed in 1988 as a demonstration sport.

Medal summary

Men's events

Women's events

Participating nations

Medal table

References

External links
 
 Sports123.com
 Videos of the 1992 Judo Summer Olympics

 
1992 Summer Olympics events
O
1992
Judo competitions in Spain